Andreas Kristler (born August 30, 1990) is an Austrian professional ice hockey forward who is currently playing for  Black Wings Linz of the ICE Hockey League (ICEHL).

Kristler competed in the 2013 IIHF World Championship as a member of the Austria men's national ice hockey team.

References

External links

1990 births
Living people
Austrian ice hockey forwards
EHC Black Wings Linz players
EC Red Bull Salzburg players
People from Lienz
EC VSV players
Sportspeople from Tyrol (state)